This page lists all described species of the spider family Phyxelididae accepted by the World Spider Catalog :

A

Ambohima

Ambohima Griswold, 1990
 A. andrefana Griswold, Wood & Carmichael, 2012 — Madagascar
 A. antsinanana Griswold, Wood & Carmichael, 2012 — Madagascar
 A. avaratra Griswold, Wood & Carmichael, 2012 — Madagascar
 A. maizina Griswold, Wood & Carmichael, 2012 — Madagascar
 A. pauliani Griswold, 1990 — Madagascar
 A. ranohira Griswold, Wood & Carmichael, 2012 — Madagascar
 A. sublima Griswold, 1990 (type) — Madagascar
 A. vato Griswold, Wood & Carmichael, 2012 — Madagascar
 A. zandry Griswold, Wood & Carmichael, 2012 — Madagascar
 A. zoky Griswold, Wood & Carmichael, 2012 — Madagascar

K

Kulalania

Kulalania Griswold, 1990
 K. antiqua Griswold, 1990 (type) — Kenya

L

Lamaika

Lamaika Griswold, 1990
 L. distincta Griswold, 1990 (type) — South Africa

M

Malaika

Malaika Lehtinen, 1967
 M. delicatula Griswold, 1990 — South Africa
 M. longipes (Purcell, 1904) (type) — South Africa

Manampoka

Manampoka Griswold, Wood & Carmichael, 2012
 M. atsimo Griswold, Wood & Carmichael, 2012 (type) — Madagascar

Matundua

Matundua Lehtinen, 1967
 M. silvatica (Purcell, 1904) (type) — South Africa

N

Namaquarachne

Namaquarachne Griswold, 1990
 N. angulata Griswold, 1990 — South Africa
 N. hottentotta (Pocock, 1900) — South Africa
 N. khoikhoiana Griswold, 1990 (type) — South Africa
 N. thaumatula Griswold, 1990 — South Africa
 N. tropata Griswold, 1990 — South Africa

P

Phyxelida

Phyxelida Simon, 1894
 P. abyssinica Griswold, 1990 — Ethiopia
 P. anatolica Griswold, 1990 — Cyprus, Turkey, Israel
 P. apwania Griswold, 1990 — Kenya, Tanzania
 P. bifoveata (Strand, 1913) — East Africa
 P. carcharata Griswold, 1990 — Kenya
 P. crassibursa Griswold, 1990 — Kenya
 P. eurygyna Griswold, 1990 — Malawi
 P. irwini Griswold, 1990 — Kenya
 P. jabalina Griswold, 1990 — Tanzania
 P. kipia Griswold, 1990 — Tanzania
 P. makapanensis Simon, 1894 (type) — South Africa
 P. mirabilis (L. Koch, 1875) — Ethiopia
 P. nebulosa (Tullgren, 1910) — Kenya, Tanzania
 P. pingoana Griswold, 1990 — Kenya
 P. sindanoa Griswold, 1990 — Kenya
 P. tanganensis (Simon & Fage, 1922) — Tanzania
 P. umlima Griswold, 1990 — Tanzania

Pongolania

Pongolania Griswold, 1990
 P. chrysionaria Griswold, 1990 — South Africa
 P. pongola Griswold, 1990 (type) — South Africa

R

Rahavavy

Rahavavy Griswold, Wood & Carmichael, 2012
 R. fanivelona (Griswold, 1990) (type) — Madagascar
 R. ida Griswold, Wood & Carmichael, 2012 — Madagascar
 R. malagasyana (Griswold, 1990) — Madagascar

T

Themacrys

Themacrys Simon, 1906
 T. cavernicola (Lawrence, 1939) — South Africa
 T. irrorata Simon, 1906 (type) — South Africa
 T. monticola (Lawrence, 1939) — South Africa
 T. silvicola (Lawrence, 1938) — South Africa
 T. ukhahlamba Griswold, 1990 — South Africa

V

Vidole

Vidole Lehtinen, 1967
 V. capensis (Pocock, 1900) (type) — South Africa
 V. helicigyna Griswold, 1990 — South Africa
 V. lyra Griswold, 1990 — South Africa
 V. schreineri (Purcell, 1904) — South Africa
 V. sothoana Griswold, 1990 — Lesotho, South Africa

Vytfutia

Vytfutia Deeleman-Reinhold, 1986
 V. bedel Deeleman-Reinhold, 1986 (type) — Indonesia (Sumatra)
 V. pallens Deeleman-Reinhold, 1989 — Borneo

X

Xevioso

Xevioso Lehtinen, 1967
 X. amica Griswold, 1990 — South Africa
 X. aululata Griswold, 1990 — South Africa
 X. cepfi Pett & Jocqué, 2020 — Mozambique
 X. colobata Griswold, 1990 — South Africa
 X. jocquei Griswold, 1990 — Malawi
 X. kulufa Griswold, 1990 — South Africa
 X. lichmadina Griswold, 1990 — South Africa
 X. megcummingae Pett & Jocqué, 2020 — Malawi, Zimbabwe
 X. orthomeles Griswold, 1990 — Zimbabwe, Eswatini, South Africa
 X. tuberculata (Lawrence, 1939) (type) — South Africa
 X. zuluana (Lawrence, 1939) — South Africa

References

Phyxelididae